Mamta Sagar is an Indian poet, academic, and activist writing in the Kannada language. Her writings focus on identity politics, feminism, and issues around linguistic and cultural diversity. She is a professor of Academic and Creative Writing at Srishti Institute of Art, Design and Technology.

Bibliography
 Kaada Navilina Hejje (Footprints of the Wild Peacock) - 1992
 Chukki Chukki Chandakki - 1993
 Nadiya Neerina Teva (Dampness of the River) - 1999
 Hiige Haaleya Maile Haadu (Like This the song) - 2007
 Growing Up as a Woman Writer - 2007
 MahiLa Vishaya - 2007
 Illi Salluva Maatu - 2010
 Hide & Seek - 2014
 kShaNabindu - 2018
 Interversions (compilation)

Translation work
 Poems by Tirumalamba
 The Swing of Desire - the play Mayye Bhaara Manave Bhaara
 Seemantha (2003) - short story by Nagaveni
 870 (2011) - by Emily Dickinson
 Slovenian-Kannada Literature Interactions (2011)
 Beyond Barriers: Slovenian-Kannada Literature Interactions (2011)
 Slovenian-Kannada Literature Interactions (2011)
 Preetiya Nalavattu NiyamagaLu (2017) - novel by Elif Shafak

Other work
Sagar has translated poetry, prose, and critical writings into Kannada and English. Her own poems have been translated into many languages, and have been included in textbooks from Jain University, Bangalore and the University of Kerala. Some of her poems are accompanied by music by Vasu Dixit, Bindumalini, and Sunitha Ananthaswamy. 

Sagar produced Interversions 1,2, & 3, three poetry films based on her own collection of the same name, with Srishti Films as part of the Wales-India collaborative projects (2018). She has also written and produced For Gauri, a video presentation of her poem written for Gauri Lankesh.

Sagar has curated international and national poetry and theater events in Hyderabad and Bangalore, including Kaavya Sanje, a multilingual community poetry event at the Bangalore Literature Festival. She is also involved in international poetry translation projects.

References

External links

 Ljubljana Poetry Festival, Slovenia
 International Poetry Translation Workshop, Dane, Sezana, Slovenia
 GRANADA POETRY FESTIVAL 2010, NICARAGUA
 Literature Festival, Hanoi-Ha long bay, Vietnam 2010
 International Poetry Festival of Medellin,Colombia
 Poetry Africa 2005
 Seemantha, Translated By Mamta G Sagar
 Best Poems from Mamta G. Sagar
 MahiLa Vishaya Book launch in Hyderabad

Indian women dramatists and playwrights
1966 births
Living people
Kannada poets
Writers from Bangalore
Indian women poets
20th-century Indian translators
20th-century Indian poets
Women writers from Karnataka
20th-century Indian dramatists and playwrights
20th-century Indian women writers
Indian women translators
Dramatists and playwrights from Karnataka
Poets from Karnataka